Erding is a Landkreis (district) in Bavaria, Germany. It is bounded by (from the north and clockwise) the districts of Landshut, Mühldorf, Ebersberg, Munich and Freising.

History
The region is one of the oldest parts of Bavaria. Erding was located on the way between two important centres of power in the Wittelsbach state, Munich and Landshut. About 1230 a castle was built on the river Sempt in order to secure the road. This castle grew to become the town of Erding.

The district of Erding was founded in 1946. Slight modifications took place in the administrative reform of 1971, when some villages from neighbouring districts were awarded to Erding.

Geography
The district covers agriculturally used areas northeast of Munich. Several affluents of the Isar River cross the district from south to north, among them the Sempt. In the northwest there is the Erdinger Moos, which was once a large fen. A substantial part of this swampy area was drained in order to build the new airport of Munich, which was opened to the public in 1992.

Coat of arms
The coat of arms displays:
 the white and blue lozengy pattern of Bavaria
 the horse from the arms of the county of Haag

Towns and municipalities

References

External links

 Official website (German)

 
Districts of Bavaria